A uterine transplant is a surgical procedure whereby a healthy uterus is transplanted into an organism of which the uterus is absent or diseased. As part of normal mammalian sexual reproduction, a diseased or absent uterus does not allow normal embryonic implantation, effectively rendering the female infertile. This phenomenon is known as absolute uterine factor infertility (AUFI). Uterine transplant is a potential treatment for this form of infertility.

History

Studies 
In 1896, Emil Knauer, a 29-year-old Austrian working in one of Vienna's gynecological clinics, published the first study of ovarian autotransplantation documenting normal function in a rabbit. This led to the investigation of uterine transplantation in 1918.    In 1964 and 1966, Eraslan, Hamernik and Hardy, at the University of Mississippi Medical Center in Jackson, Mississippi, were the first to perform an animal (dog) autotransplantation of the uterus and subsequently deliver a pregnancy from that uterus. In 2010 Diaz-Garcia and co-workers, at Department of Obstetrics and Gynecology, University of Gothenburg in Sweden, demonstrated the world's first successful allogenic uterus transplantation, in a rat, with healthy offspring.

Notable cases

Germany 
Except perhaps in rare cases of intersex individuals, transgender women are born with a male reproductive system.  While sex reassignment surgery can create a  vagina for these women, the option of a uterus is currently unavailable to them, meaning they cannot carry a pregnancy and would need to take other routes to parenthood, whether it be a more traditional approach involving coitus or an alternative one such as adoption, egg donation, or a gestational carrier. General interest in uterine transplants for transgender women has waned in recent decades, due to the success and subsequent widespread availability of assisted reproductive technology, and being transgender has become virtually synonymous with being infertile. Nonetheless, at least one uterine transplant for a trans woman occurred, for the Danish artist Lili Elbe (1882–1931), in one of the medical field's first attempts treating the needs of transgender patients to achieve pregnancy. Hoping to have children with her fiancé, she underwent a uterine transplant in 1931, in conjunction with vaginoplasty, in Germany at the age of 48. However, she developed a postsurgical infection and died from cardiac arrest just three months later.

Saudi Arabia 
The first modern day attempt at a uterine transplant occurred in 2000, in Saudi Arabia. Dr. Wafa Fageeh transplanted a uterus, taken from a 46-year-old patient, into a 26-year-old patient whose uterus had been damaged by hemorrhaging following childbirth. Because the patient ultimately needed for the uterus to be removed after just 99 days, due to necrosis, whether or not the case is considered successful is disputed, but the uterus did function for a time, with the patient experiencing two menstrual cycles. Members of the medical community have expressed concerns over the ethics of the procedure.

Turkey 
The first incidence of a uterine transplant involving a deceased donor occurred in Turkey on 9 August 2011; the surgery, performed by Dr. Ömer Özkan and Dr. Munire Erman Akar, at the Akdeniz University Hospital in Antalya, on Derya Sert, a 21-year-old patient who'd been born without a uterus. In this case, the patient enjoyed long-term success with the transplanted uterus, experiencing periods and, two years post-surgery, pregnancy. During that pregnancy, Sert underwent an abortion in her first trimester, after her doctor was unable to detect a fetal heartbeat, but this is a common complication and may not have been related to the transplant. Following another pregnancy that was initiated with in vitro fertilisation and sustained for 28 weeks, the patient finally delivered a baby on June 4, 2020.

Sweden 
In Sweden in 2012, the first mother-to-daughter womb transplant was done by Swedish doctors at Sahlgrenska University Hospital at Gothenburg University led by Mats Brännström.

In October 2014, it was announced that, for the first time, a healthy baby had been born to a uterine transplant recipient, at an undisclosed location in Sweden. The British medical journal The Lancet reported that the baby boy had been born in September, weighing 1.8 kg (3.9 lb) and that the father had said his son was "amazing". The baby had been delivered prematurely at about 32 weeks, by cesarean section, after the mother had developed pre-eclampsia. The Swedish woman, aged 36, had received a uterus in 2013, from a live 61-year-old donor, in an operation led by Dr. Brännström, Professor of Obstetrics and Gynaecology at the University of Gothenburg. The woman had healthy ovaries but was born without a uterus, a condition that affects about one in 4,500 women. The procedure used an embryo from a laboratory, created using the woman's ovum and her husband's sperm, which was then implanted into the transplanted uterus. The uterus may have been damaged in the course of the caesarian delivery and it may or may not be suitable for future pregnancies. A regimen of triple immuno-suppression was used with tacrolimus, azathioprine, and corticosteroids. Three mild rejection episodes occurred, one during the pregnancy, but were all successfully suppressed with medication. Some other women were also reported to be pregnant at that time using transplanted uteri.

United States 
The first uterine transplant performed in the United States took place on 24 February 2016 at the Cleveland Clinic. The team was led by Dr Andreas Tzakis. The transplant failed due to an undisclosed complication on 8 March, and the uterus was removed. In April, they reported a yeast infection had spread to one of the arteries the surgeons had connected to provide blood flow to the transplanted uterus, which damaged the artery and caused blood clots to form.

In November 2017, the first baby was born after a uterus transplantation in the US. The birth occurred at Baylor University Medical Center in Dallas, Texas, by Drs Liza Johannesson and Giuliano Testa, after a uterus donation from a non-directed living donor. The first baby born after a deceased donor uterus transplant in the US was at the Cleveland Clinic in June 2019.

India 
The first uterine transplant performed in India took place on 18 May 2017 at the Galaxy Care Hospital in Pune, Maharashtra. The 26-year-old patient had been born without a uterus, and received her mother's womb in the transplant. India's first uterine transplant baby, weighing 1.45 kg, was delivered through a Caesarean section at Galaxy Care Hospital in Pune on Thursday. The surgery was performed by a team of doctors at Pune's Galaxy Care Hospital and led by the hospital's medical director, Dr. Shailesh Puntambekar.

Brazil 
The first uterine transplant performed in Brazil took place on 2016 at the Hospital das Clínicas da USP in São Paulo. The 32-year-old patient had Mayer-Rokitansky-Küster-Hauser Syndrome, and therefore born without an uterus, and received a deceased donor's womb in the transplant. Brazil's first uterine transplant baby was delivered through a Caesarean section at Hospital das Clínicas da USP in December 2017. The surgery was performed by a team of doctors at Hospital das Clínicas da USP and led by Dr. Dani Ejzenberg, the head of the Human Reproductive Center at the hospital. Results of this procedure, the first to be performed in Latin America, were published in the medical journal The Lancet, in December 2018.

Current status 
The transplant is intended to be temporary – recipients will have to undergo a hysterectomy after one or two successful pregnancies. This is done to avoid the need to take immunosuppressive drugs for life with a consequent increased risk of infection.

The procedure remains the last resort: it is a relatively new and somewhat experimental procedure, performed only by certain specialist surgeons in select centres, it is expensive and unlikely to be covered by insurance, and it involves risk of infection and organ rejection. Some ethics specialists consider the risks to a live donor too great, and some find the entire procedure ethically questionable, especially since the transplant is not a life-saving procedure.

Description

Procedures
Uterine transplantation starts with the uterus retrieval surgery on the donor. Working techniques for this exist for animals, including primates and more recently humans. The recovered uterus may need to be stored, for example for transportation to the location of the recipient. Studies on cold-ischemia reperfusion indicate an ischemic tolerance of more than 24 hours.

The recipient has to look at potentially three major surgeries. First of all, there is the transplantation surgery. If a pregnancy is established and carried to viability a cesarean section is performed. As the recipient is treated with immuno-suppressive therapy, eventually, after completion of childbearing, a hysterectomy needs to be done so that the immuno-suppressive therapy can be terminated.

Ethics

Montreal criteria
Aside from considerations of costs, uterine transplantation involves complex ethical issues. The principle of autonomy supports the procedure, while the principle of non-maleficence argues against it. In regard to the principles of beneficence and justice the procedure appears equivocal. To address this dilemma the "Montreal Criteria for the Ethical Feasibility of Uterine Transplantation" were developed at McGill University and published in Transplant International in 2012.  The Montreal Criteria are a set of criteria deemed to be required for the ethical execution of the uterine transplant in humans. These findings were presented at the International Federation of Gynecology and Obstetrics' 20th World Congress in Rome in October 2012. In 2013 an update to "The Montreal Criteria for the Ethical Feasibility of Uterine Transplantation" was published in Fertility and Sterility and has been proposed as the international standard for the ethical execution of the procedure.

The criteria set conditions for the recipient, the donor, and the health care team, specifically:
  The recipient is a genetic female, with the ability to consent, with no medical contraindications to transplantation, has uterine disease that has failed other therapy, and has "a personal or legal contraindication" to other options (surrogacy, adoption). The recipient needs to be considered suitable for motherhood, deemed to be psychologically fit on evaluation, is likely to be compliant with treatment and the medical team, and understands the risks of the procedure.
  The donor is a female of reproductive age with no contraindication to the procedure who has concluded her childbearing or consented donating her uterus after her death. There is no coercion and the donor is responsible and capable of making informed decisions.
 The health care team belongs to an institution that meets Moore's third criterion regarding institutional stability and has provided informed consent to both parties. There is no conflict of interests, and anonymity can be protected unless recipient or donor waive this right.

See also
 Male pregnancy
 Transgender pregnancy
 Transplantable organs and tissues

References

External links
 Nine Swedish women undergo uterus transplants

Obstetrical and gynaecological procedures
Organ transplantation
Uterus